Kisber may refer to:
Kisbér, Hungary
Kisber (horse) (1873–1895), a Hungarian-bred thoroughbred racehorse
Kisber Felver, sport horse breed
Matt Kisber (born 1960), American businessman and politician